Vaundy is a Japanese musician. He started his career in 2019 by independently uploading online, before breaking out late in the year with the song "Tokyo Flash". He has released songs for multiple TV shows, including "Chainsaw Blood" for Chainsaw Man and "Hadaka no Yuusha" for Ranking of Kings.

History 
Vaundy got his start by releasing songs independently onto YouTube in 2019. He broke out in December of the same year with his song "Tokyo Flash". Following this success, he was selected as one of the Spotify "Early Noise 2020", and was named a "Space Shower Retsuden New Force" artist for 2020. He released his debut album Strobo on May 27, 2020. It peaked at number 5 on the Oricon Albums Chart. A song from the album, titled "Tomoshibi", was used as the theme song for the 2020 drama Tokyo Love Story.

He released the EP Hadaka no Yuusha on February 23, 2022. It included the song of the same name, which was used as the opening for the anime Ranking of Kings. It peaked at number 6 on the Oricon charts. On September 8-9 2022, he performed two shows at the Nippon Budokan. On October 12, he released the Chainsaw Man ending theme "Chainsaw Blood". It peaked at number 13 on the Billboard Japan Hot 100. He performed on the 73rd Kōhaku Uta Gassen to end the year. This performance helped him reach 2nd on the Billboard Japan Top Artists chart, and the song he performed, "Kaiju no Hanauta", jumped to number 3 on the Billboard Japan Hot 100, later peaking at #2.

Discography

Studio albums

Extended plays

Awards and nominations

References

External links 

2000 births
Living people
21st-century Japanese male singers
Japanese male pop singers
Japanese male singer-songwriters
Singers from Tokyo